Yunus ibn Matta is a prophet and messenger of God (Allah). Yunus is traditionally viewed as highly important in Islam as a prophet who was faithful to God and delivered his messages. Yunus is the only one of the Bible's Twelve Minor Prophets to be named in the Quran. The tenth chapter of the Quran is named after him. 

In the Quran, Yunus is mentioned several times by name, as an apostle of Allah, and as Dhul-Nun.

Quranic mentions 
In Al-Anbiya 21:87 and Al-Qalam 68:48, Yunus is called Dhul-Nūn. In An-Nisa 4:163 and Al-An'am 6:86, he is referred to as "an apostle of Allah". Surah 37:139-148 retells the full story of Yunus:The Quran does not mention Yunus' heritage, but Muslim tradition teaches that Yunus was from the tribe of Binyjamin.

Hadithic mentions 
Yunus is also mentioned in a few incidents during the lifetime of Muhammad. In some instances, Yunus' name is spoken of with praise and reverence by Muhammad. According to historical narrations about Muhammad's life, after ten years of receiving revelations, Muhammad went to the city of Ta’if to see if its leaders would allow him to preach his message from there rather than Mecca, but he was cast from the city by the people. He took shelter in the garden of Utbah and Shaybah, two members of the Quraysh tribe. They sent their servant, Addas, to serve him grapes for sustenance. Muhammad asked Addas where he was from and the servant replied Nineveh. "The town of Yunus the just, son of Amittai!" Muhammad exclaimed. Addas was shocked because he knew that the pagan Arabs had no knowledge of Yunus. He then asked how Muhammad knew of this man. "We are brothers," Muhammad replied. "Yunus was a Prophet of God and I, too, am a Prophet of God." Addas immediately accepted Islam and kissed the hands and feet of Muhammad.

One of the sayings of Muhammad, in the collection of Imam Bukhari, says that Muhammad said "One should not say that I am better than Yunus". Ibn Abi al-Salt, an older contemporary of Muhammad, taught that, had Yunus not prayed to Allah, he would have remained trapped inside the fish until Day of Resurrection but, because of his prayer, Yunus "stayed only a few days within the belly of the fish".

The ninth-century Persian historian Al-Tabari records that, while Jonah was inside the fish, "none of his bones or members were injured". Al-Tabari also writes that Allah made the body of the fish transparent, allowing Yunus to see the "wonders of the deep" and that Yunus heard all the fish singing praises to Allah. Kisai Marvazi, a tenth-century poet, records that Yunus' father was seventy years old when Yunus was born and that he died soon afterwards, leaving Yunus' mother with nothing but a wooden spoon, which turned out to be a cornucopia.

Tombs 

Nineveh's current location is marked by excavations of five gates, parts of walls on four sides, and two large mounds: the hill of Kuyunjik and hill of Nabi Yunus (see map link in footnote). A mosque atop Nabi Yunus was dedicated to Jonah and contained a shrine, which was revered by both Muslims and Christians as the site of Jonah's tomb. The tomb was a popular pilgrimage site and a symbol of unity to Jews, Christians, and Muslims across the Middle East. On July 24, 2014, the Islamic State of Iraq and the Levant (ISIL) destroyed the mosque containing the tomb as part of a campaign to destroy religious sanctuaries it deemed to be idolatrous. After Mosul was taken back from ISIL in January 2017, an ancient Assyrian palace built by Esarhaddon dating to around the first half of the 7th century BCE was discovered beneath the ruined mosque. ISIL had plundered the palace of items to sell on the black market, but some of the artifacts that were more difficult to transport still remained in place.

Other Muslim tombs 
Another tradition places the tomb at a hill now called Giv'at Yonah, "Jonah's Hill", at the northern edge of the Israeli town of Ashdod, at a site covered by a modern lighthouse.

A tomb of Jonah can be found in Diyarbakir, Turkey, located behind the mihrab at Fatih Pasha Mosque. Evliya Çelebi states in his Seyahatname that he visited the tombs of Jonah.

References

Works cited 
 
 
 
 
 
 
 
 
 
 

Hebrew Bible prophets of the Quran
Jonah